Bheemavarappadu is a small village in Kondapuram mandalam of Nellore district, Andhra Pradesh, India.

References 

Villages in Nellore district